Worship & Faith is the fifteenth studio album released in 2003 by American country music artist Randy Travis. It is the third gospel music album of his career, as well as his third release on Word Records. The album is composed of twenty covers of traditional gospel tunes. It was recorded live in concert at the Orlando Calvary Assembly of God in Orlando, Florida, in July 2003.  Worship & Faith is certified gold by the RIAA, although its only single, "Above All", failed to chart.

Track listing
"He's My Rock, My Sword, My Shield" (Traditional) – 2:30
"Farther Along" (J.R. Baxter, W.B. Stevens) – 3:39
"How Great Thou Art" (Stuart K. Hine) – 4:29
"Just a Closer Walk with Thee" (Traditional) – 4:37
"Shall We Gather at the River?" (Robert Lowry) – 3:16
"You Are Worthy of My Praise" (David Ruis) – 4:18
"Love Lifted Me" (James Rowe, Howard Smith) – 3:11
"Softly and Tenderly" (Will L. Thompson) – 3:19
"Sweet By and By" (Sanford Filmore Bennett, Joseph Philbrock Webster) – 2:27
"Blessed Assurance" (Fanny J. Crosby, Phoebe Knapp) – 3:28
"I'll Fly Away" (Albert E. Brumley) – 2:59
"Turn Your Radio On" (Brumley) – 2:37
"Open the Eyes of My Heart" (Paul Baloche) – 3:55
"In the Garden" (C. Austin Miles) – 3:21
"Above All" (Baloche, Lenny LeBlanc) – 4:14
"Will the Circle Be Unbroken?" (Charles Gabriel, Ada R. Habershon) – 3:08
"We Fall Down" (Chris Tomlin) – 3:40
"Peace in the Valley" (Rev. Thomas A. Dorsey) – 3:58
"The Unclouded Day" (Josiah K. Alwood) – 2:56
"Room at the Cross for You" (Ira Stanphill) – 1:30

Personnel

 John Anderson – background vocals
 David Angell – violin
 Larry Beaird – acoustic guitar
 Dennis Crouch – upright bass
 Eric Darken – percussion, handclapping 
 David Davidson – violin
 Billy Davis – background vocals
 Chip Davis – background vocals
 Nirva Dorsaint – soprano vocals
 Jerry Douglas – dobro
 Craig Duncan – Hammer Dulcimer
 Jason Eskridge – tenor vocals
 Typharee Fitzgerald – alto vocals
 Larry Franklin – fiddle
 Paul Franklin – pedabro
 Pastor Matthew Hagee – background vocals
 Sandra Hagee – background vocals
 Tony Harrell – accordion, harmonium
 Don Hart – string arrangements
 Wes Hightower – background vocals
 Sharese "Reecy" Jackson – alto vocals
 Kirk "Jelly Roll" Johnson – harmonica
 Christina Ketterling – background vocals
 Anthony LaMarchina – cello
 Mark Lusk – acoustic guitar
 Liana Manis – background vocals
 Paige Lackey Martin – soprano vocals
 Brent Mason – acoustic guitar, gut string guitar, soloist
 Cynthia Matthews – alto vocals
 John Mock – bodhrán, concertina, tin whistle
 Krystle Ochsner – soprano vocals
 Mac Powell – background vocals
 Shannon Sanders – choir arrangements, tenor vocals
 Bryan Sutton – banjo, acoustic guitar, mandolin
 Randy Travis – lead vocals
 Craig Watkins – tenor vocals
 Joy Lynn White – background vocals
 Kristin Wilkinson – viola
 Casey Wood – handclapping

Chart performance

Weekly charts

Year-end charts

References

2003 albums
Randy Travis albums
Word Records albums
Albums produced by Kyle Lehning